The Battle of Klock's Field, also called the Battle of Failing's Orchard; and occasionally the Battle of Nellis Flatts or the Battle of Stone Arabia, was an encounter between elements of New York colonial militia and a British-supported expedition of Indians and Loyalists led by Lieutenant Colonel Sir John Johnson and Captain Joseph Brant.

Prelude
Colonel John Brown, commanding a force of Massachusetts levies and New York militia and rangers, advanced from his post at Fort Paris in Stone Arabia with the aim of defeating one of Johnson's detachments, which British deserters had told him was isolated and smaller than his 360-man garrison. Instead, Johnson met Brown with his main force and, gradually outflanking and enveloping the rebels, defeated them in a running battle, during which Brown was killed.

Battle
Late in the day, Brigadier General Robert Van Rensselaer, commanding units of the Albany County militia, Tryon County militia and New York State Levies under the command of Colonels John Harper and Lewis DuBois, caught up with Johnson on a farm owned by George G. Klock (or George Jr.) in the westernmost portion of Lot 13 of the Francis Harrison Patent. A battle ensued which lasted until the Loyalist forces were outflanked by the [right] column of Van Rensselaer's force on the flats of Dederick Failing's farm on Lot 14 and George G. Klock's farm on Lot 13 of the Harrison Patent near the current eastern boundary of the village of St. Johnsville. The fighting continued quite briskly until it became painfully apparent to General Van Rensselaer that his right and left flanks were firing upon one another, and the general ordered his men to retreat three miles eastward to Fox's mills where they could be properly victualed and rested, after having been on the march and in battle for approximately 26 hours with only a couple of hours rest.

During the heat of battle, Sir John Johnson, Colonel John Butler, and Joseph Brant with the Native American contingent escaped on horseback to the south side of the river, leaving the men to fend for themselves. Some crossed the river in breast-high water near the site of the battle, while the majority of troops marched westward to a fording place just east of old Fort Hendrick. A skirmish broke out on the south bank when the British troops came in contact with the Pickett guard at Fort Windecker. Twenty of Johnson's men including his personal butler were captured.  During their precipitous escape, Johnson's men were forced to abandon their cannon, their baggage, and most of the prisoners they had captured earlier.

Aftermath
In spite of the Loyalist losses, Johnson's campaign to destroy the agriculture and settlements of the area was enormously successful. It was said afterwards that "everything except the soil is destroyed from Fort Hunter to Stone Arabia", a twenty-mile (32 km) swath of the Mohawk Valley.

References
Berry, A.J., A Time of Terror, The Story of Colonel Jacob Klock's Regiment and the People they Protected, 2005, 

Lenig, Wayne, Fort Plain, Fort Plank, and Fort Rensselaer: The Revolutionary War Forts at Canajohary, 2020,    ISBN 1-7923-3498-6

Watt, Gavin, The Burning of the Valleys, 1997, 

Klock's Field
Klock's Field
Klock's Field
Klock's Field
1780 in the United States
Montgomery County, New York
Klock's Field
1780 in New York (state)